Khablain Na Mohra is a town in the Islamabad Capital Territory of Pakistan. It is located at 33° 26' 15N 73° 25' 5E with an altitude of 545 metres (1791 feet).

References 

Union councils of Islamabad Capital Territory